Potoczek may refer to:

Potoczek, Głogów County in Lower Silesian Voivodeship (south-west Poland)
Potoczek, Kłodzko County in Lower Silesian Voivodeship (south-west Poland)
Potoczek, Janów Lubelski County in Lublin Voivodeship (east Poland)
Potoczek, Zamość County in Lublin Voivodeship (east Poland)
Potoczek, Świętokrzyskie Voivodeship (south-central Poland)